

The Men's Teams open archery competition at the 2004 Summer Paralympics was held on 26 September at the Olympic Baseball Centre (Athens).

The event was won by the team representing .

Results

Ranking Round

Competition bracket

[1] Decided by additional arrows: 18:26
[2] Decided by additional arrows: 22:25
[3] Zero score recorded "For infringement of IPC rules"

Team Lists

References

M